Hepatocystis taiwanensis is a species of parasitic protozoa. They are transmitted by flies of the genus Culicoides and infect monkeys.

Taxonomy

This species was described in 1941 by Yokogawa in Formosan rock macaque (Macaca cyclopis). It was reclassified as a species of Hepatocystis by Garnham in 1951.

Distribution

This species is found in Taiwan.

Hosts

This species infects Formosan rock macacque (Macaca cyclopis).

References

Parasites of Diptera
Parasites of primates
Haemosporida